Ivan Strinić (born 17 July 1987) is a Croatian retired footballer who played as a left-back. Strinić spent his professional career playing in a number of clubs from Croatian, Ukrainian and Italian top flight, including Hajduk Split, Napoli and Dnipro Dnipropetrovsk.

Club career

Early career
Born in Split, Strinić started his youth career with Hajduk Split, where he stayed until 2006, then he moved to France to play for Le Mans B. Following his return to Croatia he played for NK Hrvatski Dragovoljac where he was spotted by his native club Hajduk Split.

Hajduk Split
Even though he was close to finishing a deal with Dinamo Zagreb, Strinić decided to sign for his youth club Hajduk Split. His first competitive match for Hajduk came on the opening of the 2008–09 season against NK Zadar on Poljud Stadium, ending in 1–0 win for Hajduk. During his first season with Hajduk he appeared in 17 domestic league games, playing in the position of left-back.

In the 2009–10 season he proved himself as the first team regular starter, earning his first call-up for national team as well. He managed to score four goals in the league, including one in the eternal derby against Dinamo Zagreb in a 2–1 win.

In the 2010–11 season, Strinić played in all of Hajduk's matches in 2010–11 UEFA Europa League campaign against RSC Anderlecht, AEK and Zenit St. Petersburg. He also became the starting left-back in the national side, playing in eight out of nine qualifiers for Euro 2012.

He left Hajduk in January 2011 after amassing 77 appearances in all competitions for the Split-based side, scoring five goals.

FC Dnipro Dnipropetrovsk

On 27 January 2011, Strinić signed with Dnipro Dnipropetrovsk for reported fee of 4 million euro. Strinić made his debut for Dnipro in a league match against Tavriya Simferopol in a 2–2 draw with the left back scoring a stunning goal. He made five other appearances that season in a slow start to his Dnipro career.

The 2011–12 season was far better for Strinić as he made 27 appearances in all competitions and played all three games in Croatia's Euro 2012 campaign.

The 2012–13 season was similarly successful for Strinić as he maintained his starting places with both the national side and his club side, amassing 35 appearances for Dnipro in all competitions.

In December 2014, Strinić announced that he would not be renewing his contract with the club with his contract expiring at the end of that month.

Napoli
The player subsequently signed with S.S.C. Napoli, after 112 games over four years with the Ukrainian club.

Sampdoria
On 31 August 2017, Strinić joined Sampdoria for a reported fee of €2 million, signing a one-year deal.

AC Milan
In March 2018, Strinić signed a pre-contract with AC Milan. The deal was officialized on 2 July 2018 while he was in Russia playing for the national team at the World Cup. On 18 August 2018, a heart condition which was found meant the temporary withdrawal from football training sessions. He became available again for selection into matchday squads since 12 January 2019 and was on the team's bench 10 times before the end of season. In July 2019, he made his unofficial debut for Milan, starting in a friendly against Bayern Munich as a center back. On 26 August 2019, Strinić and the club's management mutually agreed to the terms of contract termination, ending the deal two years in advance.

International career

Strinić received his first call-up for Croatia national football team under manager Slaven Bilić for a friendly match against Austria on 19 May 2010. Since then he has been regular starter for Croatia and the first choice for their left-back position. He was a part of the Croatia national football team on UEFA Euro 2012 in Poland, where he played all three games in group stage. He provided an assist for Mario Mandžukić in the match against Italy, to equalize the result on 1–1. Although he was the first choice left back during the qualification matches, he missed out on the 2014 World Cup finals in Brazil due to a hamstring injury.

In May 2018, Strinić was named in Croatia's squad for the 2018 World Cup in Russia. He started in six of the seven matches in the team's runners-up finish, including the final. However, due to a diagnosed heart condition, Strinić was forced to withdraw from football. When he recovered, he was out of shape and has never been called-up again. He earned a total of 49 caps, scoring no goals.

Career statistics

International

Honours
Hajduk Split
Croatian Football Cup: 2009–10

Croatia
FIFA World Cup runner-up: 2018

Orders
Order of Duke Branimir: 2018

References

External links
 

1987 births
Living people
Footballers from Split, Croatia
Association football defenders
Croatian footballers
Croatia youth international footballers
Croatia under-21 international footballers
Croatia international footballers
UEFA Euro 2012 players
UEFA Euro 2016 players
2018 FIFA World Cup players
NK Hrvatski Dragovoljac players
HNK Hajduk Split players
FC Dnipro players
S.S.C. Napoli players
U.C. Sampdoria players
A.C. Milan players
Croatian Football League players
Ukrainian Premier League players
Serie A players
Croatian expatriate footballers
Expatriate footballers in France
Croatian expatriate sportspeople in France
Expatriate footballers in Italy
Croatian expatriate sportspeople in Italy
Expatriate footballers in Ukraine
Croatian expatriate sportspeople in Ukraine